Siegfried Lorenz can refer to:

 Siegfried Lorenz (athlete) (born 1933), German athlete
 Siegfried Lorenz (baritone) (born 1945), German singer
 Siegfried Lorenz (politician) (born 1930), German politician